The Shar Pei (Cantonese: shā pèih or Mandarin: 沙皮 shā pí) is a dog breed from 
southern China. Traditionally kept as a property guardian, the Shar Pei was driven to the brink of extinction in the 20th century. The breed is known in the West for its deep wrinkles, while a traditional less wrinkled form is maintained in Hong Kong.

History 

There are no records indicating the origins of the Shar Pei, although it closely resembles effigies of an un-wrinkled type of guard dog kept in southern China during the Han dynasty; some believe the modern breed, along with the Chow Chow, descends from these dogs. The breed has been identified as a basal breed that predates the emergence of the modern breeds in the 19th century.

The Shar Pei was once very popular, but war and political turmoil in China in the 20th century took its toll on the breed and by the 1970s it was close to extinction. In 1973 a Hong Kong businessman named Matgo Law appealed to the international community, in particular the American Kennel Club, to help save the breed; by 1978 the breed was named by The Guinness Book of Records as the world’s rarest breed, with only 60 remaining. The resultant publicity led to great demand in the United States for examples of the breed, and unscrupulous breeders in Hong Kong, Macau and Taiwan took to crossing their remaining purebred animals with other breeds including the Bull Terrier, Pug and Bulldog, and selling the offspring to unwitting American buyers. The results of the crossings led to a dog with a much fleshier mouth than the original breed, these dogs became known as "meat-mouth" Shar Peis, while the original dogs are called "bone-mouth" Shar Peis.

The cause of saving the breed was taken up in the United States by enthusiastic breeders using the dogs smuggled there in the 1970s, a breed club was founded and it received American Kennel Club recognition in 1992, with breed standard specifying a meat-mouth type dog. Some breeders in Hong Kong maintain the traditional bone-mouth type, although it is estimated only 50 to 100 examples of this type remain.

In the United States, a number of breeders have selectively bred Shar Peis for a smaller size, creating what they call the Miniature Shar Pei, much to the opposition of many breeders of traditionally sized Shar Peis. Standing to a maximum , the Miniature Shar Pei is bred for both for its smaller size and increased wrinkles.

Description 

The Shar Pei is a short-coated medium-sized breed of dog, renowned for its excessively wrinkled skin. The breed resembles many dog breeds from the mastiff family; however, it is most closely related to spitz breeds, with the Chow Chow being its closest relative. This is most clearly seen with the two breeds both possessing unique blue-black tongues. This dog falls within the same genetic group as the Chow Chow, the Akita, the Shiba Inu, the Malamute and the Greenland dog.

The Chinese breed standard states they have clam-shell ears, butterfly nose, melon-shaped head, grandmotherly face, water buffalo neck, horse's buttocks and dragon's legs. The breed's head is relatively large compared to its body with a broad muzzle that usually darker than the rest of the coat and well padded causing a bulge at its base, the ears are set wide apart and are small and triangular, and the eyes are set very deeply into the folds of skin on the head. The breed has straight, well boned, muscular legs below sloping shoulders and a medium length broad tail that is curled over their back in a manner typical of spitz-type dogs.

Health
Because of its popularity after being introduced to North America in the 1970s, the breed suffered much inexperienced or rushed breeding. This resulted in not only a dramatically different look for the Shar Pei (as its most distinctive features, including its wrinkles and rounded snout, were exaggerated), but also many health problems. The American breed club states that few Shar Peis reach the age of 10 and it has a longevity program recording those dogs that live to 10 years or more.

Compared to other breeds, Shar Peis have an increased risk of developing atopic dermatitis, a chronic allergic skin disease. Dogs with allergic skin disease often get allergy-induced skin infections. Shar Peis are also at an increased risk of demodicosis, a disease which happens when Demodex canis mites proliferate and cause skin irritation, inflammation and infection.

Familial Shar Pei fever (FSF) is a serious congenital disease that causes short fevers lasting from 24 hours to sometimes up to three days and usually accompanied by accumulation of fluid around the ankles (called Swollen Hock Syndrome). Amyloidosis, a long-term condition, is most likely related to FSF, caused by unprocessed amyloid proteins depositing in the organs, most often in the kidneys or liver, leading eventually to kidney failure. The disease is associated with the Western type and it is estimated that 23% are affected. The Australian breed standard was changed in 2009 to discourage breeding for heavy wrinkling.

A common problem is a painful eye condition, entropion, in which the eyelashes curl inward, irritating the eye. If untreated, it can cause blindness. This condition can be fixed by surgery ("tacking" the eyelids up so they will not roll onto the eyeball for puppies or surgically removing extra skin in adolescent and older Shar Peis). In Australia, more than eight in 10 Shar Peis require surgery to correct eye problems, contributing to them being the most expensive breed to insure.

The Shar Pei is also prone to chronic yeast infections in its ears. This is due to a tight inner ear structure with a wrinkled appearance, making cleaning very difficult; exacerbated by the tight "flap" that the ear creates over the canal, promoting a moist environment.

Vitamin B12 deficiency is a common problem in the Shar Pei and is suspected to be hereditary.

See also
 Dogs portal
 List of dog breeds

References

External links

 

FCI breeds
Dog fighting breeds
Dog breeds originating in China